Nancy McGovern is a digital preservation specialist. She was elected to be the 72nd President of the Society of American Archivists (SAA) and served in that capacity from 2016 to 2017.

Career

Nancy McGovern is the Director of Digital Preservation at MIT Libraries and the 72nd president of the Society of American Archivists (2016-2017). She presented her SAA Presidential Address, "Archives, History, and Technology: Prologue and Possibilities for SAA and the Archival Community" at the 2018 Annual Meeting of the Society. McGovern was named a pioneer in digital preservation by the Library of Congress in 2010. McGovern was previously a research assistant professor and digital preservation officer at the Inter-university Consortium for Political and Social Research (ICPSR) at the University of Michigan and Director of Research and Assessment Services and digital preservation officer at Cornell University. McGovern's work has focused on digital preservation and practice since 1986, when she became senior staff of the Center for Electronic Records at the U.S. National Archives and Records Administration. 

In 2003, while working at Cornell, McGovern, with Anne R. Kenney, co-developed the Digital Preservation Management Workshop for digital preservation managers. The workshops have been attended by more than 500 participants representing more than 250 organizations from over 30 countries spanning 5 continents.

Education
PhD, Archival Studies, University College London, 2009
MA, History, Northeastern University, 1983, certificate in archives administration
BA, History, Saint Anselm College, 1982

Honors
Distinguished Fellow, Society of American Archivists, 2009. 
SAA Preservation Publication Award: Aligning National Approaches to Digital Preservation (ANADP), volume editor, 2013. 
Digital Preservation Pioneer, NDIIPP, 2010. 
SAA Preservation Publication Award: Digital Preservation Management, online tutorial, 2004.
Research Fellow, Study of Modern Archives, Bentley Historical Library, 1994.

References

Year of birth missing (living people)
Living people
American archivists
Female archivists
Fellows of the Society of American Archivists
Saint Anselm College alumni
Northeastern University alumni
Alumni of University College London